Tomás Conechny (born 30 March 1998) is an Argentine professional footballer who plays as a winger or an attacking midfielder for Club Almagro in the Primera Nacional.

Club career

San Lorenzo
Born in Comodoro Rivadavia, Niño de Cobre began his career with local side Comisión de Actividades Infantiles before travelling more than 1000 miles across the country to join San Lorenzo in 2014, at the age of 16. Earlier in the year, he had been invited by Premier League club Liverpool to attend a trial. He made his debut for San Lorenzo on 16 October 2016, coming on as a second-half substitute for Fernando Belluschi in a 3–1 win over Arsenal de Sarandí. He made 14 appearances for the club over the course of the next two years before joining MLS side Portland Timbers on loan in 2018.

Loan to Portland Timbers
On 17 July 2018, Conechny signed for Portland Timbers on a season-long loan, claiming an international roster slot, with the club retaining the option of purchase. He struggled for game time in his debut season with the club, however, playing just 72 minutes across four appearances but his loan was extended for another season at the end of the campaign.

Portland Timbers
On 22 July 2019, Conechny made his move to Portland permanent.

On 10 March 2021, Conechny and Portland mutually agreed to terminate his contract.

Deportivo Maldonado
On 2 April 2021, Conechny signed with Uruguayan Primera División side Deportivo Maldonado.

Almagro
At the end of December 2021, Conechny signed a deal with Club Almagro.

International career

Argentina national youth teams
Conechny is an Argentine youth international and has amassed over 20 appearances across various youth levels. He represented Argentina at the 2015 South American Under-17 Football Championship in Paraguay and at the 2015 FIFA U-17 World Cup in Chile. During the former tournament, and on the day of his 17th birthday, he suffered multiple minor injuries when he fell 10 feet from his hotel window after celebrating scoring a goal while playing FIFA on his PlayStation. He was Argentina's top goalscorer at the tournament with five goals, but missed the final due to the injuries he sustained during the accident. He recovered to play in the U-17 World Cup later that year and scored Argentina's lone goal during that tournament.

In December 2016, he was called up to the Argentina U20 side for the 2017 South American Youth Football Championship. He scored once during the group stages before Argentina ended the tournament in fourth position, thereby qualifying for the 2017 FIFA U-20 World Cup. Conechny was included in the squad for the latter tournament alongside San Lorenzo teammate Marcos Senesi. He featured in each of Argentina's three matches, though the nation failed to progress from the group-stage.

Career statistics

Club

 

1 Includes Copa Argentina matches.

References

External links

1998 births
Living people
Association football forwards
Argentine footballers
Argentine expatriate footballers
Argentina under-20 international footballers
Argentina youth international footballers
Argentine people of Czech descent
People from Comodoro Rivadavia
San Lorenzo de Almagro footballers
Portland Timbers players
Portland Timbers 2 players
Argentine Primera División players
USL Championship players
Major League Soccer players
Deportivo Maldonado players
Club Almagro players
Argentine expatriate sportspeople in the United States
Argentine expatriate sportspeople in Uruguay
Expatriate soccer players in the United States
Expatriate footballers in Uruguay